(born April 10, 1967) is a former Major League Baseball player. Humphreys played for the New York Yankees from 1991 to 1993. He batted and threw right-handed.

Amateur career
 In 1987, he played collegiate summer baseball with the Orleans Cardinals of the Cape Cod Baseball League and was named a league all-star.

Professional career
 He then went on to play for the New York Yankees.

Personal

He was signed as a free agent on 7/13/2021 by the Los Angeles Angels.  He currently plays for the Rocket City Trash Pandas (AA-level minor league team for the Angels) in Madison, Alabama.

References

External links

1967 births
Living people
New York Yankees players
Major League Baseball outfielders
Baseball players from Dallas
Spokane Indians players
Riverside Red Wave players
Wichita Wranglers players
Las Vegas Stars (baseball) players
Columbus Clippers players
Buffalo Bisons (minor league) players
Tacoma Rainiers players
Rhode Island Tigersharks players
Texas Tech Red Raiders baseball players
Orleans Firebirds players